The 1997 Major League Soccer College Draft was held on February 1 and 2, 1997 in Fort Lauderdale, Florida. The draft was held in conjunction with the Umbro Select College All-Star Classic. The first round of the draft took place at halftime of the game and was broadcast live by Prime Sports. The second and third rounds of the draft took place February 2, 1997, beginning at 9:00 AM EST in the Fort Lauderdale Airport Hilton. The 1997 MLS Supplemental Draft took place on the afternoon of February 2, 1997.

Round 1

Round 1 trades

Round 2

Round 2 trades
No trades reported.

Round 3

Round 3 trades

References

Major League Soccer drafts
Draft
MLS College Draft
Soccer in Florida
Sports in Fort Lauderdale, Florida
Events in Fort Lauderdale, Florida
MLS College Draft